Jack Wunhym (31 May 1908 – 23 July 1965) was a former Australian rules footballer who played with Footscray in the Victorian Football League (VFL).

His surname is a merger from the surname of his father, who was Chinese.

Notes

External links 
		

1908 births
1965 deaths
Australian rules footballers from Victoria (Australia)
Western Bulldogs players
Australian people of Chinese descent